Daniel Uziel (1967–) is an Israeli historian and head of photographic collections at Yad Vashem. His doctoral thesis was on the Wehrmacht propaganda corps and was accepted in 2001 by Hebrew University in Jerusalem.

Works

References

Yad Vashem people
Israeli historians
Historians of the Holocaust
1967 births
Living people
Hebrew University of Jerusalem alumni